Anne Renaud (born 24 March 1970 in Ambilly) is a former French athlete, who specialized in the 400 meters hurdles.

Biography  
She won three titles of champion of France in the 400m hurdles in 1995, 1996 and 1997.

Prize list  
 French Championships in Athletics   :  
 3 times winner of the 400m hurdles in 1995,  1996 and 1997.

Records

Notes and references  
 Docathlé2003, Fédération française d'athlétisme, 2003, p. 428

1970 births
Living people
French female hurdlers